Saurodactylus fasciatus, also known as the banded-toed gecko or banded lizard-fingered gecko, is a species of lizards in the family Gekkonidae endemic to Morocco.

Its natural habitats are temperate forests, Mediterranean-type shrubby vegetation, rocky areas, arable land, and pastureland.
It is threatened by habitat loss.

References

Saurodactylus
Endemic fauna of Morocco
Reptiles described in 1931
Reptiles of North Africa
Taxonomy articles created by Polbot